

Distribution

Disease associations
A26 Serotype is associated with  adult T-cell leukemia in Japanese.

References

2